Monodilepas is a species of small sea snail, a keyhole limpet, a marine gastropod mollusc in the family Fissurellidae, the keyhole limpets and slit limpets.

Species
Species within the genus Monodilepas include:

Monodilepas diemenensis Finlay, 1930
Monodilepas monilifera Finlay, 1873
subspeciesMonodilepas monilifera carnleyensis Powell, 1955
subspeciesMonodilepas monilifera cookiana Dell, 1953
Monodilepas otagoensis Finlay, 1930
Monodilepas skinneri Finlay, 1928

References

 Powell A. W. B., William Collins Publishers Ltd, Auckland 1979 

Fissurellidae
Taxa named by Harold John Finlay